Andriy Remenyuk (born 3 February 1999) is a professional Ukrainian football forward who plays for Metalist 1925 Kharkiv.

Career
Remenyuk is a product of the UFK Lviv School System and then played for FC Karpaty in the Ukrainian Premier League Reserves and Under 19 Championship.

He made his debut for FC Karpaty as a substituted player in a losing game against FC Shakhtar Donetsk on 4 March 2018 in the Ukrainian Premier League.

References

External links
Statistics at FFU website (Ukr)

1999 births
Living people
Ukrainian footballers
Association football forwards
FC Karpaty Lviv players
FC Rukh Lviv players
FC Kalush players
FC Metalist 1925 Kharkiv players
Ukrainian Premier League players
Ukrainian First League players
Ukrainian Second League players
Ukraine youth international footballers
Sportspeople from Vinnytsia Oblast